Orlando Vincent Johnson (born March 11, 1989) is an American professional basketball player for Club Atlético Aguada of the Liga Uruguaya de Básquetbol (LUB). He played college basketball for Loyola Marymount and UC Santa Barbara.

College career
Johnson, a 6'5 shooting guard from Palma High School in Salinas, California, first played collegiately at Loyola Marymount.  As a freshman in the 2007–08 season, Johnson averaged 12.4 points and 4.9 rebounds per game, leading the Lions in both categories.  Following a coaching change at LMU, Johnson transferred to UCSB.

After sitting out the 2008–09 season per NCAA transfer rules, Johnson made an instant impact in the Big West Conference for the Gauchos, averaging 18 points and 5.9 rebounds per game.  Johnson also led the Gauchos to the 2010 Big West Conference men's basketball tournament title and an NCAA appearance.  Following the season, he was named the Big West conference player of the year and an honorable mention All-American by the Associated Press.

As a junior in 2010–11, Johnson averaged 21.1 points and 6.2 rebounds per game and was again named first team All-Big West.  He also led the Gauchos to another conference tournament title and NCAA tournament appearance, again earning Big West tournament MVP honors.

Following his junior season, Johnson declared himself eligible for the 2011 NBA draft, but opted to return to UCSB for his senior season.

Prior to the start of his senior season, Johnson was named to the preseason watch lists for the Wooden Award, Naismith Award, and the Lowe's Senior CLASS Award.

Professional career

Indiana Pacers (2012–2014)
Johnson was selected with the 36th overall pick in the 2012 NBA draft by the Sacramento Kings. He was immediately traded to the Indiana Pacers. On July 12, 2012, he signed a multi-year deal with the Pacers. On March 23, 2013, he scored a season-high 15 points in a win over the Atlanta Hawks. During his rookie season, he had multiple assignments with the Fort Wayne Mad Ants of the NBA Development League.

On February 6, 2014, he was reassigned to the Mad Ants. On February 13, 2014, he was recalled by the Pacers. On February 20, 2014, he was waived by the Pacers.

Sacramento Kings (2014)
On February 26, 2014, Johnson signed a 10-day contract with the Sacramento Kings. On March 8, 2014, he signed a second 10-day contract with the Kings. On March 18, 2014, the Kings did not offer him a rest of season contract.

Laboral Kutxa Vitoria (2014)
On August 14, 2014, Johnson signed a one-year deal with the Spanish team Laboral Kutxa Vitoria. On October 28, 2014, he was released by Laboral after appearing in just six games.

Austin Spurs (2014–2015)
On December 3, 2014, he was acquired by the Austin Spurs of the NBA Development League.

Barangay Ginebra San Miguel (2015)
On April 29, 2015, Johnson signed with Barangay Ginebra San Miguel of the Philippine Basketball Association. In 12 games for Barangay, he averaged 33.7 points and 11.3 rebounds per game.

Austin Spurs (2015–2016)
On October 30, 2015, Johnson was reacquired by the Austin Spurs. On January 29, 2016, he was named in the West All-Star team for the 2016 NBA D-League All-Star Game.

Return to the NBA (2016)
On February 5, 2016, Johnson signed a 10-day contract with the Phoenix Suns. He made his debut for the Suns the following day, recording seven points, one rebound and one steal in 19 minutes of action against the Utah Jazz. On February 10, he recorded 9 points, a career-high 8 rebounds and a career-high 3 blocks in a loss to the Golden State Warriors. On February 15, the Suns did not renew his contract, making him a free agent. Five days later, Johnson returned to the Austin Spurs, recording 17 points, eight rebounds, six assists and three steals in 43 minutes that night against the Oklahoma City Blue in a 96–94 win.

On March 9, 2016, Johnson signed a 10-day contract with the New Orleans Pelicans to help the team deal with numerous injuries. New Orleans had to use an NBA hardship exemption in order to sign him as he made their roster stand at 16, one over the allowed limited of 15. That night, he made his debut for the Pelicans in a 122–113 loss to the Charlotte Hornets, recording five points and three rebounds in 20 minutes as a starter. On March 20, the Pelicans did not renew his contract, making him a free agent. The next day, he returned to Austin.

Guangxi Rhino (2016)
In July 2016, Johnson joined the Guangxi Rhino of the Chinese National Basketball League. He helped the team reach the quarter-final round of the league but fell short of advancing to the semi-final stage after losing to Henan Roaring Elephants. In six games for Guangxi, he averaged 36.5 points, 7.5 rebounds, 4.8 assists and 1.2 steals per game.

UNICS Kazan (2016–2017)
On September 8, 2016, Johnson signed with the Milwaukee Bucks, but was waived on October 22 after appearing in five preseason games. On November 1, he signed a three-month deal with the Russian team UNICS Kazan.

Austin Spurs (2017)
On March 2, 2017, Johnson was acquired by the Austin Spurs of the NBA Development League, returning to the franchise for a third stint.

Al Riyadi Beirut (2017)
On April 8, 2017, Johnson signed with Sporting Al Riyadi Beirut of the Lebanese Basketball League.

Igokea (2018)
On September 18, 2018, Johnson signed with Igokea of the Bosnian League. He had 18 points and 5 assists in his debut in the ABA Super Cup. Johnson was cut on October 6, 2018, after not recovering from a knee injury.

Pauian (2019)
On January 3, 2019, Johnson was reported to be added to roster of the Pauian of the Super Basketball League (SBL). On January 4, Johnson made his debut for the Pauian and scored 28 points with five rebounds, five assists, a steal and a block in an 87–73 win over the Yulon Luxgen Dinos.

Avtodor Saratov (2019–2020)
On August 19, 2019, Johnson signed with Avtodor Saratov of the VTB United League.

Brisbane Bullets (2020–2021)
On November 16, 2020, Johnson signed with the Brisbane Bullets of the Australian National Basketball League (NBL). He was released by the Bullets on March 17, 2021.

San Miguel Beermen (2022)
On December 30, 2021, Johnson signed with the San Miguel Beermen of the Philippine Basketball Association (PBA).

NBA career statistics

Regular season

|-
| align="left" | 
| align="left" | Indiana
| 51 || 0 || 12.1 || .400 || .383 || .719 || 2.2 || 0.9 || .2 || .2 || 4.0
|-
| align="left" | 
| align="left" | Indiana
| 38 || 0 || 9.0 || .344 || .195 || .773 || 1.3 || .4 || .2 || .0 || 2.4
|-
| align="left"| 
| align="left"| Sacramento
| 7 || 0 || 7.1 || .176 || .167 || .500 || .6 || .6 || .0 || .1 || 1.3
|-
| align="left" | 
| align="left" | Phoenix
| 2 || 0 || 23.5 || .294 || .200 || .833 || 4.5 || .0 || 1.0 || 1.5 || 8.0
|-
| align="left"| 
| align="left"| New Orleans
| 5 || 1 || 10.8 || .235 || .200 || .500 || 1.2 || .4 || .2 || .0 || 2.0
|- class="sortbottom"
| style="text-align:center;" colspan="2"| Career
| 103 || 1 || 10.8 || .358 || .311 || .727 || 1.7 || 0.7 || .2 || .1 || 3.2

Playoffs

|-
| style="text-align:left;"| 2013
| style="text-align:left;"| Indiana
| 12 || 0 || 2.3 || .182 || .333 || .556 || 0.3 || .1 || .0 || .0 || 0.8
|- class="sortbottom"
| style="text-align:center;" colspan="2"| Career
| 12 || 0 || 2.3 || .182 || .333 || .556 || 0.3 || .1 || .0 || .0 || 0.8

National team career
Following his junior season at UCSB, Johnson was chosen to represent the United States as a member of Team USA at the 2011 World University Games in Shenzhen, China. He played in all eight matches of the tournament, averaging 7.3 points and 3.9 rebounds per game as the team finished 7–1.

Personal life
Johnson's mother was murdered when he was one year old, and the grandmother who took him in watched her house burn down six years later. Four more of Johnson's family members perished in that blaze, and his grandmother died when he was 11. Johnson's two older brothers raised him afterwards and ensured that Johnson graduated from college.

See also

References

External links

Orlando Johnson at euroleague.net
UC Santa Barbara Gauchos bio

1989 births
Living people
ABA League players
Al Riyadi Club Beirut basketball players
American expatriate basketball people in Australia
American expatriate basketball people in Bosnia and Herzegovina
American expatriate basketball people in China
American expatriate basketball people in the Dominican Republic
American expatriate basketball people in Lebanon
American expatriate basketball people in the Philippines
American expatriate basketball people in Russia
American expatriate basketball people in Spain
American expatriate basketball people in Taiwan
American men's basketball players
Austin Spurs players
Barangay Ginebra San Miguel players
Basketball players from California
BC Avtodor Saratov players
BC UNICS players
Brisbane Bullets players
Fort Wayne Mad Ants players
Indiana Pacers players
KK Igokea players
Liga ACB players
Loyola Marymount Lions men's basketball players
New Orleans Pelicans players
Pauian Archiland basketball players
Philippine Basketball Association imports
Phoenix Suns players
Sacramento Kings draft picks
Sacramento Kings players
San Miguel Beermen players
Saski Baskonia players
Shooting guards
Sportspeople from Monterey, California
Super Basketball League imports
UC Santa Barbara Gauchos men's basketball players